Ran Itzhak (born 9 October 1987) is an Israeli footballer who plays for Hapoel Kfar Saba as a striker.

Career

Early career
Itzhak was playing in Hapoel Haifa youth team and first team in his career.
He moved to Maccabi Ironi Kiryat Ata in 2009 for a half year loan. The following season he moved to Bnei Sakhnin in the First Division.
Itzhak returned to the Second Division to play at Hapoel Rishon LeZion in season 2010/2011, scoring 9 goals in 28 matches, as he was manages to qualify for a first league with Rishon.
In 2011, he returned to the first division by 3 games at Ironi Nir Ramat HaSharon.
Itzhak returned again to the second division to Hapoel Kfar Saba at 2012.
He returned to Ironi Nir Ramat HaSharon the following season and moved in January 2013 Hapoel Ramat Gan, scoring 8 goals in the all season.

Hapoel Tel Aviv
Itzhak signed at Hapoel Tel Aviv in June 2013, one of the biggest clubs in Israel, for 3 years contract.

References

1987 births
Living people
Israeli footballers
Hapoel Haifa F.C. players
Maccabi Ironi Kiryat Ata F.C. players
Bnei Sakhnin F.C. players
Hapoel Rishon LeZion F.C. players
Hapoel Nir Ramat HaSharon F.C. players
Hapoel Kfar Saba F.C. players
Hapoel Ramat Gan F.C. players
Hapoel Tel Aviv F.C. players
Hapoel Katamon Jerusalem F.C. players
Liga Leumit players
Israeli Premier League players
Footballers from Northern District (Israel)
Association football forwards